The Three Musketeers, the 1844 novel by author Alexandre Dumas, has been adapted into multiple films, both live-action and animated.

Films
The Three Musketeers, a 1903 French production about which very little is known
The Three Musketeers: Part 1 and Part 2, 1911 silent film shorts from Edison Studios starring Sydney Booth (a member of the Booth family) as D'Artagnan
Les trois mousquetaires, 1913, French silent film serial directed by André Calmettes, which ran in two installments: La haine de Richelieu and Le triomphe de d’Artagnan 
The Three Musketeers, a 1914 American film directed by Charles V. Henkel and starring Earl Talbot
The Three Musketeers (1916 film), a Hollywood feature directed by Charles Swickard, supervised by Thomas H. Ince and including in its cast Louise Glaum as Milady de Winter and Dorothy Dalton as Queen Anne
Les Trois Mousquetaires, a 1921 French film featuring Aimé Simon-Girard and Claude Mérelle.  A blockbuster of its day, it spawned a number of sequels. (An adaptation of Twenty Years After was released the following year.)
The Three Musketeers (1921 film), starring Douglas Fairbanks
Les Trois Mousquetaires (1933 film), a French talkie remake of the 1921 French film, with the same director (Henri Diamant-Berger) and much of the same cast
The Three Musketeers (1933 serial), a Mascot Studios serial featuring John Wayne, updated and set in North Africa, with the Musketeers replaced by French Foreign Legionnaires
The Three Musketeers (1935 film), featuring Walter Abel
The Four Musketeers (1936 film), an Italian adventure film. It reportedly involved the use of three thousand marionettes
The Three Musketeers (1939 film), a comedic version starring Don Ameche and the Ritz Brothers
Los Tres Mosqueteros (1942), a Mexican movie directed by Miguel M. Delgado and starring Cantinflas as D'Artagnan
The Three Musketeers (1946 film), an Argentinian/Uruguayan film
The Three Musketeers (1948 film), an MGM production starring Gene Kelly, Van Heflin, Lana Turner, June Allyson, and Angela Lansbury
The Three Musketeers (1953 film), directed by André Hunebelle, featuring Georges Marchal and Bourvil
Los tres mosqueteros y medio (1957), a Mexican comedic version starring Tin-Tan
The Three Musketeers (1961 film), a double-feature adaptation directed by Bernard Borderie, with Gérard Barray, Mylène Demongeot, Guy Delorme and Jean Carmet
The Three Musketeers (1969 film), a television movie starring Kenneth Welsh and featuring Christopher Walken
The Three Musketeers (1973 film), and The Four Musketeers (1974 film), a two-film adaptation starring Michael York, Charlton Heston, Raquel Welch, Oliver Reed, Frank Finlay, Faye Dunaway, Richard Chamberlain, and Spike Milligan
D'Artagnan and Three Musketeers (1978), a popular Soviet musical featuring Mikhail Boyarsky 
The Return of the Musketeers (1989), a sequel to The Three Musketeers (1973 film), and The Four Musketeers (1974 film), also starring Michael York, Oliver Reed and Frank Finlay.
The Three Musketeers (1993 film), a Disney production starring Charlie Sheen, Kiefer Sutherland, Chris O'Donnell, Oliver Platt, Tim Curry, and Rebecca De Mornay
The Musketeer (2001), a very loose adaptation, in a style imitating Asian action movies
Three Musketeers (2004 musical), a musical film with Volodymyr Zelenskyy, in which the three musketeers are women
D'Artagnan et les trois mousquetaires (2005), starring Vincent Elbaz
 The Three Musketeers (2011 film), a 3D version directed by Paul W. S. Anderson and starring Logan Lerman and Ray Stevenson, Luke Evans, Christoph Waltz, Mads Mikkelsen, Orlando Bloom, Milla Jovovich, Gabriella Wilde and Matthew Macfadyen
 3 Musketeers, a 2011 direct-to-video modern action adaptation produced by The Asylum
 The Three Musketeers (2013 film), a Russian historical adventure film
 The Fourth Musketeer (2022), a British adventure film featuring Sean Cronin as Rochefort
 The Three Musketeers: D'Artagnan and The Three Musketeers: Milady, a 2023 two-part French adventure film saga starring François Civil, Vincent Cassel, Pio Marmaï, Romain Duris and Eva Green

Animated versions
Three Blind Mouseketeers, a 1936 Disney Silly Symphony cartoon starring the voices of Billy Bletcher, and Pinto Colvig
The Two Mouseketeers, a 1952 Tom and Jerry cartoon, with three follow-ups, Touché, Pussy Cat!, Tom and Chérie and Royal Cat Nap
The Three Musketeers in Boots, a 1972 anime from Toei Animation featuring cats as the main characters
d'Artagnan l'intrépide, a 1974 animated feature film directed by John Halas
Dog in Boots (1981), Soyuzmultfilm's animated parody film directed by Yefim Gamburg
Dogtanian and the Three Muskehounds (1981-82+), a cartoon serial faithfully adapting the story  with anthropomorphic dogs.
The Three Musketeers (1986 film), an Australian made-for-television animated adventure film from Burbank Films Australia
The Three Musketeers (1992 film), a production using classical music
Mickey, Donald, Goofy: The Three Musketeers (2004), another Disney remake, this one is a made-for-video film. The plot makes it more like a sequel, actually featuring the Musketeers from the original story as separate characters.
Barbie and the Three Musketeers (2009), a direct-to-video Barbie movie in which the Musketeers are female

Films based on sequels of the novel
The Return of the Musketeers (1989), a film version of Twenty Years After by the team responsible for the 1973 and 1974 films and is a direct sequel to them, featuring much of the same cast
Musketeers Twenty Years After (1992), a Russian musical featuring Mikhail Boyarsky, sequel to D'Artagnan and Three Musketeers
The Secret of Queen Anna, or Musketeers Thirty Years After (1993), a Russian musical based on The Vicomte de Bragelonne and starring Mikhail Boyarsky as d'Artagnan (see also The Return of the Musketeers, or The Treasures of Cardinal Mazarin below)
The King's Musketeers (2018), an Italian comedy film loosely based on Twenty Years After.

Many films have been based in whole or in part on the final section of the final novel of the trilogy, The Vicomte de Bragelonne; see Man in the Iron Mask#Films and television.

Films featuring "descendants" of the Musketeers
At Sword's Point (1952), an RKO Radio picture starring Cornel Wilde, Dan O'Herlihy, Alan Hale, Jr., and Maureen O'Hara as the sons and daughter of the original Musketeers
 (1992), a TV movie directed by John Paragon, starring David Hasselhoff, Thomas Gottschalk, Cheech Marin, Alison Doody, John Rhys-Davies, and Corbin Bernsen. Set in modern times, the descendants of the Musketeers protect the innocent.
The Return of the Musketeers, or The Treasures of Cardinal Mazarin (2009), a Russian musical starring Mikhail Boyarsky as d'Artagnan, who, with the other Musketeers, return from the dead to save their sons and daughters (see also The Secret of Queen Anna, or Musketeers Thirty Years After in the previous section)
Revenge of the Musketeers (1994) (The Daughter of d'Artagnan), a French production starring Sophie Marceau in the title role, and Philippe Noiret as an aged d'Artagnan
La Femme Musketeer (2004), a made-for-TV production starring Susie Amy as d'Artagnan's daughter "Valentine", with Michael York, Gérard Depardieu, Christopher Cazenove, John Rhys-Davies, and Nastassja Kinski

Other
A Modern Musketeer (1917), in which Douglas Fairbanks plays both D'Artagnan and his modern-day emulator
Milady and the Musketeers (1952), a prequel about Athos and Milady de Winter, starring Yvette Lebon, Rossano Brazzi and Massimo Serato
Les Quatre Charlots Mousquetaires (1974) and A Nous Quatre Cardinal (1974), a two-part comedy parody starring Les Charlots as the Musketeers' valets

See also
The Three Mesquiteers, a series of 51 western B-movies released between 1936 and 1943
The Three Musketeers, a 1954 BBC adaptation in six 30-minute episodes, starring Laurence Payne, Roger Delgado, Paul Whitsun-Jones and Paul Hansard
The Three Musketeers, a 1966 BBC adaptation in ten 25-minute episodes, directed by Peter Hammond and starring Jeremy Brett, Jeremy Young, and Brian Blessed
The Three Musketeers (American TV series), a series of animated shorts produced by Hanna-Barbera in 1968 as part of The Banana Splits television show
The Three Musketeers, a 1973 Australian made-for-TV cartoon, one of a series of Famous Classic Tales adaptations
Dogtanian and the Three Muskehounds, a 1981 Spanish animated series featuring dogs as the main characters
The Return of Dogtanian, a 1989 sequel animated series which takes place 10 years after the original series and is loosely based on the novel The Vicomte de Bragelonne, also written by Alexandre Dumas
The Three Musketeers Anime (Anime Sanjūshi), a Japanese animated series produced by Gakken
Young Blades, a television series that aired on PAX
 The Three Musketeers (2013 TV series), a Russian series directed by Sergey Zhigunov and Alexey Zlobin
The Musketeers, a 2014 BBC series by Adrian Hodges

 
Lists of films by source